The men's wakeboard competition of the Water skiing events at the 2011 Pan American Games in Guadalajara were held from October 20 to October 23 at the Boca Laguna Water Ski Track. The defending champion was Marcelo Giardi of Brazil.

Schedule
All times are Central Standard time (UTC-6).

Results
As there were only eight competitors the semi-final served as a ranking round as all competitors advanced to the final round.

Semifinal

Final

References

Water skiing at the 2011 Pan American Games